Aiphanes pilaris is a plant in the family Arecaceae, native to Colombia.

Description
The inflorescences feature long stalks and bear lilac flowers. The fruits turn brown when ripe.

Distribution and habitat
Aiphanes pilaris is endemic to Colombia, where it is known only from Putumayo Department. Its habitat is in highland Andean forests, at elevations above .

Conservation
Aiphanes pilaris has been assessed as critically endangered on the IUCN Red List. The species is at risk from the expansion of agriculture for crop and livestock farming. The species is not in present in any protected areas.

References

pilaris
Endemic flora of Colombia
Plants described in 2001